Donald James Leslie (April 13, 1911 – September 2, 2004) created and manufactured the Leslie speaker that refined the sound of the Hammond organ and helped popularize electronic music.

Leslie experimented with devices to, in his words, improve the sound of the Hammond organ, based on experience he gathered from other jobs, including repairing radios and one at the Naval Research Laboratory in Washington, D.C., during World War II.

Donald Leslie was impressed with the sound of a Hammond organ in a concert hall but less enthused with it in a confined space. There, the sound had no resonance, and the pure electronic oscillators sounded "dull, shrill, and still" to Leslie's ear. To remedy this problem, in 1937 he invented a speaker which rotates inside its cabinet, producing a Doppler effect which modulates the sound. To some extent this imitates the resonance of the organ in a large auditorium by projecting it 360 degrees. This device was eventually one of over 50 patents he owned.

When Leslie presented Laurens Hammond with his handmade organ speaker, the company rejected it.  Leslie then chose to manufacture his Leslie speaker himself. He founded Electro Music to produce the speakers. Wanting to keep control of their organ's sound, Hammond went to great lengths to defeat Leslie's invention: changing connectors on newer models, and forbidding Hammond organ merchants to sell Leslie speakers. In 1965 his company was acquired by CBS. Leslie remained as a consultant long enough to see Hammond's death in 1973, at which point Hammond's company warmed to the invention, officially honoring it in 1978. Leslie retired in 1980.

It was predominantly used for liturgical and gospel church organs creating a Theatre Organ Tremulant effect.  It was used with the Hammond Tone Wheel Organ as well as others in the 1940s through 1950s as well as today. The final version of the Leslie speaker is the Rotosonic drum wherein a loudspeaker is physically mounted in the spinning rotor with a narrow aperture (opening) to produce an authentic Theatre Organ tremulant sound.  It was also used in psychedelic and rock music of the 1960s and 1970s. It has since been used in many genres of music, including pop music and jazz. It wasn't until the 1980s that Hammond bought Leslie's product to include with their organs.

Leslie was inducted into the American Music Conference Hall of Fame in 2003.

References

External links

 
NAMM Oral History Interview May 13, 2001

1911 births
2004 deaths
American audio engineers
20th-century American engineers
20th-century American inventors